Giulio Battiferri (15 July 1893 – 22 January 1973) was an Italian actor. He appeared in more than one hundred films from 1939 to 1972. He was married to the actress Pina Piovani.

Life and career 
With this and other companies directed by Monaldi he toured nationally and abroad, performing in England, France, Spain and South America. After the death of Monaldi, he specialized in the revue genre. 

Sporadically active in films of the silent era, starting from 1939 he became one of the most active Italian character actors of his time. He was the brother of the silent film actress Fernanda Battiferri.

Selected filmography

References

External links 

1893 births
1973 deaths
Italian male film actors